Louisiana Highway 9 (LA 9) is a state highway located in northern Louisiana.  It runs  in a north–south direction from the concurrent U.S. Highways 71 and 84 (US 71-84) in Campti to a junction with the concurrent US 63 and US 167 in Junction City.

The highway traverses the thick piney woods of northern Louisiana roughly midway between the parallel US 167 and US 371 corridors.  Over the northern half of its route, LA 9 connects the towns of Arcadia and Homer - the seats of Bienville and Claiborne parishes, respectively - with Interstate 20 (I-20), the main highway across northern Louisiana.  LA 9 also passes through a number of smaller rural villages, such as Saline, Lucky, Bienville, Bryceland, and Athens.

Route description

Campti to Arcadia
From the south, LA 9 begins at a T-intersection with the concurrent US 71/US 84 in Campti, a small town in Natchitoches Parish.  The junction is located at a point on US 71 roughly midway between Alexandria and Shreveport.  LA 9 heads northeast out of Campti and after , the road curves due north to cross a bridge over Black Lake.  Shortly afterward, LA 9 passes through the community of Creston and intersects LA 153 and LA 156, connecting with Ashland and Goldonna, respectively.  LA 9 proceeds northeast through a thick pine forest and intersects LA 479 at Chestnut.  Shortly before crossing into Bienville Parish, the highway passes through the small community of Readhimer.  A junction there with LA 126 leads eastward to Dodson in neighboring Winn Parish.

In Bienville Parish, LA 9 immediately enters the village of Saline.  Traveling along Cooper Street, the highway passes the local high school, church, and post office.  It then turns west onto 4th Street, beginning a concurrency with LA 155.  On the way out of Saline, the two highways make a zigzag north then west.  After passing the Mill Creek Reservoir, LA 155 departs to the west toward Coushatta while LA 9 resumes its northward trajectory.  Over the next , the highway passes through three small villages.  The first, Lucky, consists mainly of a junction with LA 4, a rural cross-state route connecting to nearby points Castor and Friendship.  In the second, known as Bienville, LA 9 intersects LA 507, which connects to the Bienville Parish towns of Jamestown and Ringgold as well as Jonesboro, the seat of neighboring Jackson Parish.  LA 9 joins the Kansas City Southern Railway (KCS) line heading into Bryceland, the third village north of Saline.  Just past the local post office, LA 9 turns east at a T-intersection with LA 517.  The highway then takes a northeast course as it winds through the piney woods toward Arcadia, the parish seat.

Arcadia to Homer
LA 9 enters Arcadia on Hazel Street and intersects LA 147, another connection to Jonesboro.  After crossing the KCS rail line at grade, the highway enters the downtown area.  LA 9 meets US 80 shortly afterward at a slightly skewed four-way intersection with 1st Street.  From this intersection, LA 151 begins and proceeds north on Hazel Street toward I-20 while LA 9 turns west with US 80 onto 1st Street.  Signs direct US 80 truck traffic to follow the parallel 2nd Street through the downtown area.  US 80 and LA 9 travel along 1st Street for three blocks, passing by historic brick storefronts and other small commercial establishments.  The route turns north onto Beech Street for one block to 2nd Street, meeting LA 519 and also rejoining the US 80 truck route.  US 80 and LA 9 turn west onto 2nd Street and proceed to the town limits.  Here, US 80 continues ahead while LA 9 turns northward to an interchange with I-20 at Exit 67, connecting with Shreveport to the west and Monroe to the east.  LA 9 continues across the parish line into Claiborne Parish.

This is the first of several junctions leading to nearby Lake Claiborne State Park. At a point south of town, the highway reaches a junction with US 79, connecting with Minden to the southwest. LA 9 turns northeast with US 79 into Homer while US 79 Bypass (also signed as LA 9 Truck) begins and proceeds straight ahead on its journey around the west and north side of town.

Homer to Junction City
US 79 and LA 9 enter Homer, the seat of Claiborne Parish, on Minden Highway and curve due north onto West Main Street into the downtown area.  An intersection with LA 146 (South 3rd Street) serves as the town's connection to Lake Claiborne State Park.  Two blocks later, northbound traffic zigzags around the courthouse square to the intersection of North Main and East Main Streets.  While US 79 zigzags back onto West Main Street to proceed north toward Haynesville, LA 9 turns eastward out of Homer.  On the outside of town, LA 9 rejoins its truck route at a junction with LA 2, another rural cross-state route.

Over the next , LA 9 travels northeast and skirts the Caney Ranger District of the Kisatchie National Forest.  In the tiny community of Summerfield, LA 9 intersects LA 2 Alternate, connecting with Haynesville and Bernice.  The route then continues through another segment of the Kisatchie National Forest and crosses a bridge over Corney Lake.  About  later, LA 9 enters the village of Junction City, located on the Louisiana–Arkansas state line.  The route curves due east onto West 5th Street and ends two blocks later at South Main Street, a junction with US 63 and US 167 located on the Claiborne–Union parish line.  US 63 and US 167 travel concurrently between Ruston, Louisiana to the south and El Dorado, Arkansas to the north.

Route classification and data
LA 9 is an undivided two-lane highway with the exception of a  undivided four-lane segment on 2nd Street in Arcadia that is concurrent with US 80.  The highway is classified by the Louisiana Department of Transportation and Development (La DOTD) as a rural major collector from Campti to Homer and as a rural minor arterial from Homer to Junction City.  Daily traffic volume in 2013 peaked at 6,000 vehicles in Arcadia and 5,500 in Homer.  Most of the route averaged between 2,000 and 3,500 vehicles with a low of 880 reported between Saline and Lucky.  The posted speed limit is generally  in rural areas, reduced as low as  through Arcadia and Homer.

History

Pre-1955 route numbering
In the original Louisiana Highway system in use between 1921 and 1955, the modern LA 9 was part of three separate routes.

Southern section

The section from Campti to Creston made up the majority of pre-1955 State Route 50.  It was created in 1921 by an act of the state legislature as one of the original 98 state highway routes.

As the above description indicates, Route 50 departed from the modern LA 9 at Creston and followed what is now LA 156 northeast to Goldonna.  The route remained generally the same throughout the pre-1955 era with minor straightening of the roadway evident in several spots.  The portion of Route 50 between Campti and Creston was graveled by 1927 and paved in 1949.  The remainder of the route between Creston and Goldonna was graveled in 1928 but was not paved until after the 1955 Louisiana Highway renumbering.

During the 1920s, Route 50 was part of the Lone Star Trail, an early auto trail that roughly followed the present US 84 corridor across Louisiana in the days before the numbered U.S. Highway system was implemented.

Middle section

The middle section of LA 9 from Creston to Homer made up the majority of State Route 12, another of the original 98 state highway routes designated in 1921.

While LA 9 changes its general trajectory by turning northeast at Homer toward Junction City, Route 12 continued northward along the present path of US 79 to the Arkansas state line via Haynesville.  US 79 was placed onto the existing state highway route upon its creation in 1935, and the two remained concurrent through the pre-1955 era.  However, in the 1955 Louisiana Highway renumbering, unnecessary concurrencies between U.S. and state routes were eliminated, and the LA 9 designation was instead continued along a different pre-1955 state route north of Homer.

On its south end, Route 12 was originally designated to form a "V" by heading southwest from Saline to Chestnut then turn sharply to the northwest to a terminus at Ashland.  There was no improved route between Chestnut and Creston at this time.  However, a gravel road between these points was established by 1927, and Route 12 was changed accordingly by an act of the state legislature.  Graveling of the remainder of the distance to the Arkansas state line north of Haynesville was completed about the same time.  Otherwise, the route remained largely the same prior to the 1955 renumbering with the exception of some minor straightening, such as a zigzag at Readhimer.  The route through the town of Arcadia was also simplified somewhat.  The original route turned west from Hazel Street onto 2nd Street, then north on Myrtle Street, west on 3rd Street, north on Beech Street, and west on 6th Street.  By 1955, two turns had been eliminated as the route now followed Hazel, 1st, Beech, and 6th Streets.  Remnants of these earlier paths through town survive today in the state highway system as parts of LA 519, LA 798-1, and LA 798-2.

The paving of Route 12 was carried out in sections over the course of more than twenty years.  The portion beginning at the present junction of LA 9 and US 79 south of Homer and extending through town was completed first, around 1930.  Paving was extended north from Homer to Haynesville about a year later.  Around 1936, the paving was extended north again from Haynesville to the Arkansas state line.  All paved sections of Route 12 at this time were now also part of US 79.  By 1941, paving was extended southward from Homer to Arcadia.  Local paving projects, such as those within the municipalities of Arcadia and Athens, had already been completed by the late 1930s.  Paving was not extended south from Arcadia to Bryceland until about 1949, and the section between Chestnut and Lucky was completed by the following year.  The last sections of gravel highway on either side of Chestnut were paved around 1952.

Northern section
The remainder of the route between Homer and Junction City made up the northern portion of pre-1955 State Route 115, which was added to the system in 1928.  Route 115 had a second leg that extended southeast from Homer along the present LA 146 to Vienna in neighboring Lincoln Parish.  The portion of the route now followed by LA 9 saw only minor changes prior to the 1955 renumbering, such as the straightening of the two portions heading out of Homer and into Junction City.  Sections of the original alignment that have not been abandoned exist today as Lisbon Road in Homer and John Kelly Road in Junction City.  The entire route between Homer and Junction City was graveled by 1927.  Paving of the route between Homer and Antioch was completed during the early 1940s.  The paved highway was extended to Summerfield around 1949 and to Junction City by 1953.  Other improvements included a new bridge over Corney Lake in 1953, replacing two shorter spans.

Post-1955 route history
LA 9 was created in 1955 as a collective renumbering of portions of former State Routes 12, 50, and 115.

With the 1955 renumbering, the state highway department initially categorized all routes into three classes: "A" (primary), "B" (secondary), and "C" (farm-to-market).  This system has since been updated and replaced by a more specific functional classification system.

Since the 1955 renumbering, the route of LA 9 has remained virtually the same.  Most of the minor changes have resulted from the smoothing of several curves over the years, often as part of repaving projects.  A modest curve east of Bryceland was straightened sometime before 1967.  A number of curves between Arcadia and Athens were straightened during the 1970s.  Pieces of the original roadbed survive as local roads looping off of the current alignment.  A short section of highway hugging the Louisiana and North West Railroad line at Mulnix was re-routed around the same time.  The original alignment there followed what is now Dansby Road.  The most recent improvements have occurred in Natchitoches Parish.  A sharp curve at a defunct crossing of the Kansas City Southern Railway was smoothed out in 2010.  In November of that year, a new bridge over Black Lake was opened, replacing a lower span that was prone to flooding.

Major intersections

Truck route

Louisiana Highway 9 Truck

Louisiana Highway 9 Truck (LA 9 Truck) runs  in a semi-circle around the west and north sides of Homer, the seat of Claiborne Parish.  The route utilizes the entirety of US 79 Bypass as well as a section of LA 2 to allow truck traffic to bypass the town and avoid having to navigate around the courthouse square.

From the south, LA 9 Truck begins at an intersection with mainline LA 9 and US 79, connecting with Arcadia to the southeast and Minden to the southwest, respectively.  The route proceeds north co-signed with US 79 Bypass and travels along the west side of Homer.  After , US 79 Bypass and LA 9 Truck turn east to follow LA 2 along the north side of town.  Shortly after crossing the Louisiana and North West Railroad (LNW) line, the US 79 Bypass designation ends upon re-joining its parent route.  LA 9 Truck continues southeast with LA 2 for another  to an intersection with mainline LA 9 on the northeast side of Homer.

LA 9 Truck is an undivided two-lane highway for its entire length. The portion that is concurrent with US 79 Bypass is classified as a rural minor arterial by the Louisiana Department of Transportation and Development (La DOTD). The remainder of the route is classified as a rural major collector. The average daily traffic volume in 2013 was reported as ranging between 2,100 and 2,900 vehicles.

The north–south section of US 79 Bypass was an addition to the state highway system constructed in 2011.  The entire portion of LA 2 co-signed as LA 9 Truck was constructed in 1964, bypassing the original alignment through town now designated as LA 3062.

See also

References

External links

Maps / GIS Data Homepage, Louisiana Department of Transportation and Development

0009
Transportation in Natchitoches Parish, Louisiana
Transportation in Bienville Parish, Louisiana
Transportation in Claiborne Parish, Louisiana